Arundel Island is an island of the New Georgia Islands archipelago in the Western Province of Solomon Islands. Its indigenous names are Kohinggo and Ndokulu.

Geography
It is separated from Kolombangara by Blackett Strait. To the west lies Vonavona Island, and to northwest lies Ferguson Passage.

Round Hill, with a height of 250 feet or 76 meters, is located in the southern part of the island.

Wartime history

On August 27, 1943, the island was attacked by American forces. The Japanese lost 345 killed and 500 wounded during the fighting for the island. Eventually, General Sasaki withdrew from Arundel and Gizo on September 20–21, 1943.  Kolombangara had already been liberated by the American invasion of Vella Lavella, and, at the end of September, the Japanese began to evacuate their last base in the New Georgia islands.

References

Islands of the Solomon Islands
Western Province (Solomon Islands)